The United States Post Office building in Larchmont, New York was constructed in 1937 as part of a program started in 1853 by the Office of the Supervising Architect of the United States Treasury Department.  It is in the Colonial Revival style, which was the most popular style for post offices built in New York after World War I.  This post office was listed on the National Register of Historic Places as part of a Multiple Property Submission.  Approximately 80 buildings within the Multiple Property Submission fit into this style. 

During the 1932-1942 era of post office construction, a large number of post offices and other federal buildings were built in New York.  This surge was intended both to address the long-term need for new government facilities, as well as to employ out-of-work architects, engineers, artists, and other construction industry workers who were unemployed as a result of the Great Depression. The economic climate made it necessary to focus on functional design and a restraint in the amount of ornamentation used.  The post office was designed by consulting architect William Dewey Foster. The Treasury Department Section of Painting and Sculpture also commissioned two realistic murals depicting Larchmont scenes from that era. The murals, painted by the accomplished New York landscape artist Thomas H. Donnelly, were unveiled in 1939 and depict the Larchmont Manor House and Larchmont Yacht Club.

See also
National Register of Historic Places listings in southern Westchester County, New York

References

Larchmont, New York
Colonial Revival architecture in New York (state)
Government buildings completed in 1937
Larchmont
National Register of Historic Places in Westchester County, New York
Buildings and structures in Westchester County, New York